Nicholas Francis Robert Crafts CBE (born 9 March 1949 in Nottingham, England) is Professor of Economic History at the University of Sussex Business School, a post held from 2019. Previously he was Professor of Economics and Economic History at the University of Warwick, a post he held from 2005. Previously he was a Professor of Economic History at London School of Economics and Political Science (LSE) between 1995-2005.  He also teaches for the TRIUM Global Executive MBA Program, an alliance of NYU Stern, the LSE and HEC School of Management.  His main fields of interest are the British economy in the last 200 years, European economic growth, historical data on the British economy, the Industrial Revolution and international income distribution, especially with reference to the Human Development Index. He has produced a substantial body of papers for academic journals, the British government and international institutions such as the International Monetary Fund.

During the 1980s Crafts argued that during the Industrial Revolution an abnormally high (compared to countries which industrialised later) proportion of the British economy came to be devoted to industry and international trade, and that the British economy always tended to grow slowly. When Britain was overtaken by Germany and the USA - both larger countries - in the late nineteenth century, this was not because of any deceleration of British performance.

Early life
Crafts attended Brunts Grammar School, Mansfield. He was a student at Trinity College, Cambridge, and graduated with a BA in Economics in 1970.

Career summary
 From 1971 to 1972 he was a lecturer in Economic History at the University of Exeter.
 1974-1976 he was Visiting Assistant Professor of Economics at the University of California, Berkeley.
 1977-86 he was a fellow and praelector in economics at University College, Oxford.
 1987-1988 he was Professor of Economic History at the University of Leeds and from 1988-1995 he was Professor of Economic History, at the  University of Warwick.
 From 1995 to 2005 he was Professor of Economic History, at the London School of Economics.
 In 2005 he rejoined the University of Warwick, where he lectures in Economic History.

He was appointed Commander of the Order of the British Empire (CBE) in the 2014 Birthday Honours for services to economics.

Crafts and the British Industrial Revolution

Nick Crafts, along with Knick Harley, provided a very influential reinterpretation of the British industrial revolution in the 1980s.  They measured the growth rates of various industries, and of the different sectors of the economy, in order to measure the growth of the British economy during the industrial revolution.  The found that the overall rate of growth was much lower than had previously been believed, and was heavily concentrated in two industries: cotton and iron.   A few historians (though not Crafts himself) used these figures to suggest that it was inappropriate to describe the period as an ‘industrial revolution’.  Most, however, argued that although growth rates had been slower and steadier during the industrial revolution than previously imagined, the idea of an ‘industrial revolution’ was still valid.

Selected publications
 Edited with Gianni Toniolo. Economic Growth in Europe since 1945, Cambridge University Press, 1996, 
 1987, "Economic History," The New Palgrave: A Dictionary of Economics, v. 2, pp. 37–42.

 1985, "British Economic Growth during the Industrial Revolution"

References

External links
Profile at Warwick
CV at Warwick

Living people
1949 births
Academics of the London School of Economics
Academics of the University of Warwick
Alumni of Trinity College, Cambridge
Commanders of the Order of the British Empire
People from Nottingham
New York University Stern School of Business faculty
British economists
Academics of the University of Exeter
Fellows of University College, Oxford
Academics of the University of Leeds